The 1998–99 Wessex Football League was the 13th season of the Wessex Football League. The league champions were Lymington & New Milton, in their first season as a merged club. There was no promotion to the Southern League, and neither was there any relegation this season.

For sponsorship reasons, the league was known as the Jewson Wessex League.

League table
The league consisted of one division of 20 clubs, reduced from 21 the previous season, after Andover were promoted to the Southern League, Romsey Town were relegated, Ryde Sports resigned and AFC Lymington merged with New Milton Town of the Hampshire League. Three new clubs joined:
Fareham Town, having taken voluntary demotion from the Southern League.
Moneyfields, joining from the Hampshire League.
Lymington & New Milton, the merged club.
Aerostructures Sports & Social changed their name to Hamble A.S.S.C.

Wessex League Cup

The Jewson Wessex League Cup was won by Cowes Sports. They beat Lymington & New Milton on penalties after the match finished goalless.

References

Wessex Football League seasons
9